M'Bagnick M'Bodj (born 7 August 1940) is a Senegalese judoka. He competed in the men's heavyweight event at the 1972 Summer Olympics.

References

External links
 

1940 births
Living people
Senegalese male judoka
Olympic judoka of Senegal
Judoka at the 1972 Summer Olympics
Place of birth missing (living people)
20th-century Senegalese people
21st-century Senegalese people
African Games medalists in judo
Competitors at the 1973 All-Africa Games
African Games bronze medalists for Senegal